Blyth's horseshoe bat (Rhinolophus lepidus) is a species of bat in the family Rhinolophidae. It is found across southern Asia from Afghanistan to Vietnam. The species can be identified from its pointed, bifid sella.

Taxonomy
Blyth's horseshoe bat was described as a new species in 1844 by English zoologist Edward Blyth. Blyth noted that the holotype had likely been collected near Kolkata, India.

Description

Biology and ecology
The Blyth's horseshoe bat population on Tioman Island, Malaysia, is known to fly and hunt in the forest during the day and night. It is thought that these bats can forage during the day owing to the absence of resident avian predators in the forest there. It uses echolocation to navigate, flying in a fluttering style through cluttered airspace in search of insect prey. Its echolocation signal frequency is around 91 kHz.

Range and habitat
Blyth's horseshoe bat is widely distributed in South and Southeast Asia, and has been documented in the following countries: Afghanistan, Bangladesh, Cambodia, China, India, Indonesia, Malaysia, Myanmar, Nepal, Pakistan, Thailand, and Vietnam.

References

External links
Sound recordings of Rhinolophus lepidus on BioAcoustica

Rhinolophidae
Bats of Asia
Bats of Southeast Asia
Bats of Indonesia
Bats of Malaysia
Bat, Blyth's horseshoe
Bat, Blyth's horseshoe
Bat, Blyth's horseshoe
Bat, Blyth's horseshoe
Bat, Blyth's horseshoe
Bat, Blyth's horseshoe
Bat, Blyth's horseshoe
Bat, Blyth's horseshoe
Bat, Blyth's horseshoe
Bat, Blyth's horseshoe
Least concern biota of Asia
Mammals described in 1844
Taxonomy articles created by Polbot
Taxa named by Edward Blyth
Bats of India